Kottakkal (literally-Land of the Fort) is a municipal town in Malappuram district in Kerala, southern India having 32 wards. it is a part of Malappuram metropolitan area and a growing city in Kerala. The town is best known for the Arya Vaidya Sala, one of the top Ayurvedic health centres of the world. Kottakkal is also a major growing commercial, educational, and healthcare hub in South Malabar. The town lies on Mumbai–Kanyakumari National Highway 66.

The National Highway 66 separates the municipality from Edarikode grama panchayat on some parts to the west. However, the fast-developing Kottakkal urban area is now spread up to different parts of neighboring panchayats such as Edarikode.

Kottakkal is known for its ayurvedic heritage, Arya Vaidya Sala. Adding to the cultural heritage, Kottakkal Pooram, The popular temple festival is celebrated over seven days during March–April.

History 
An Old Malayalam inscription which dates back to 932 CE found from Indianoor in Kottakkal mention the name of Goda Ravi of Chera dynasty.

Kottakkal, formerly known as Sweta Durgam (the White Fort) in Sanskrit, Venkalikotta and Venkita Kotta in Malayalam, was a military base of the Kingdom of Valluvanadu earlier.

Two swords, medieval European in style and finish, were discovered in a well from Kottakkal, in the year 2013. The Zamorin of Calicut invaded the Kingdom of Valluvanad in 14th century CE and seized the fort at Kottakkal. The Zamorin captuted the captaincy of Mamankam festival in the same period. Karuvayoor Moosad, who was the minister of Valluvakonathiri, based at Kottakkal and also the chief marshal and preacher of the Moopil Nairs, changed his seat to Puzhakkattiri when Kottakkal came under Zamorin. It may be the forts and castles constructed by the Karuvayoor Moosad that were the origin of the name "Kottakkal".

The Kizhakke Kovilakam, where the eastern branch of the royal family of Zamorin resided, is located at Kottakkal.Gradually, Kottakkal was annexed to the kingdom of the Zamorin of Calicut.  The Kizhakke Kovilakam, which was the eastern palace of the royal family of the Zamorin of Calicut, is present at Kottakkal.

Arya Vaidya Sala was established in 1902. The suburbs of Kottakkal were known as Changuvettikkadu and Eyyakkadu (now Changuvetti is developing as a twin town to Kottakkal).

Municipal elections 

The United Democratic Front won the first elections (held in October 2010) to the Kottakkal municipality. K. K. Nazar and Paroli Moosakutty Haji of Indian Union Muslim League were elected as the Chairperson and Vice-Chairman respectively of the municipality. Other major Political representatives in the Municipality include TP Subair and Nani of Left Democratic Front.

Kottakkal Municipality Election 2020

Notable personalities 
 Vaidyaratnam P. S. Warrier (founder of Kottakkal Arya Vaidya Sala)
 K C Manorama Thampuratti (eminent Sanskrit poet)
 K. C. Manavedan Raja (founder of Raja's High School, Zamorin of Calicut during 1932-1937)
 M. K. Vellodi (Indian civil servant, diplomat, former Cabinet Secretary)
 Dr. K. C. K. E Raja, former Vice Chancellor  Kerala University and Director General of Health Services.
 Sangita Madhavan Nair, Actress
 U. A. Beeran
 Jayasree Kalathil, Researcher.
P. K. Warrier
 Kottakkal Sivaraman (eminent Kathakali artist)
 V. C. Balakrishna Panicker
 Kottakkal Madhu (Kathakali singer)
 M. P. Abdussamad Samadani (politician, MLA, former Member of Parliament)
 Sachin Warrier (playback singer and composer)
 Mohammed Ali kottakkal (social activist, kottakal kmcc president)

Basic information of Kottakkal Municipality

{ "type": "ExternalData",  "service": "geoshape",  "ids": "Q13111679"}

Wards
Kottakkal Municipality is composed of the following 32 wards:

Transportation 
 Bus services: Kottakkal Bus station at the heart of the town, links to all rural bus services around Kottakkal locality and Long route services connecting nearby towns like Manjeri, Malappuram, Perinthalmanna etc. KSRTC service also available.
 Railway Station: Tirur railway station is one of the major railway stations in the Malabar region. Almost every train stops here, connecting the Malappuram district to the rest of the country. It is located 14 km away from the Kottakkal town. Passengers from Kottakkal can also access Angadippuram railway station which is about 26 km from kottakkal town.
 Nearest Airport: Calicut International Airport is approximately 25 kilometres away.

Nearby places

 Vengara, Oorakam, Cherukulamba, Puthuparamba and Edarikode
 Indianoor, Kavathikalam, Puthanathani Marakkara, Kalpakanchery, Maravattam, Kadampuzha, Puthur, Padapparamba, Chattiparamba
 Pang, Parappur, Pottippara, Venniyoor and Vettichira

See also
 Kottakkal (State assembly constituency)
 Arya Vaidya Sala
 Malappuram metropolitan area

References

External links 
 Kottakkal in Wikimapia
 Kottakkal Municipality
 Documentary on Arya Vaidya Sala in Malayalam - https://www.youtube.com/watch?v=IuPbz-etmMI

Cities and towns in Malappuram district